The 12395 / 12396 Ziyarat Express is a Superfast Express train belonging to Indian Railways – East Central Railway zone that runs between Rajendra Nagar Terminus and  in India.

It operates as train number 12395 from Rajendra Nagar]to Ajmer Junction and as train number 12396 in the reverse direction serving the states of Bihar, Uttar Pradesh and Rajasthan.

The word Ziyarat means 'to visit' in Arabic.

Coaches

The 12395 / 12396 Ziyarat Express has 1 AC 2 tier, 1 AC 2 cum First AC, 3 AC 3 tier, 11 Sleeper Class, 3 General Unreserved & 2 EOG (End On Generator ) LHB coach. In addition, it carries a pantry car coach. It runs with LHB coach. As is customary with most train services in India, coach composition may be amended at the discretion of Indian Railways depending on demand.

Service

As the average speed of the train is above , as per Indian Railways rules, its fare includes a Superfast surcharge.

Route & Halts

Traction

The entire route is now fully electrified.

Operation 

 12395 – leaves Rajendra Nagar Terminal on every Wednesday at 18:30 Hrs IST and reaches Ajmer Junction next day at 15:10 hrs IST.
 12396 – leaves Ajmer Jn every Thursday at 23:55 Hrs IST and reach Rajendra Nagar Terminal next day at 23:15 Hrs IST

Rake sharing  

The train sharing its rake with 13281/13282 New Tinsukia–Rajendra Nagar Weekly Express.

References

External links

Transport in Ajmer
Transport in Patna
Express trains in India
Rail transport in Rajasthan
Rail transport in Uttar Pradesh
Rail transport in Bihar
Railway services introduced in 2002
Named passenger trains of India